Yoo Kee-heung (born 1947) is a Korean football manager and former fullback player. 

Yoo represented South Korea as a player during the 1974 World Cup qualifiers. 

Yoo subsequently turned to football coaching. He started in the schools with stints at the Geoje High School (1981–87) and Incheon University (1989–97) teams. 

Yoo later went on to the national level, as Korea's national team assistant manager in 1993, during the 1994 World Cup qualifiers. However, the position went to Huh Jung-moo during the 1994 finals, though apparently he remained part of the coaching setup in some capacity.

After the 1994 World Cup, he was in charge of the South Korean women's national team (1999–2001), Bhutanese teams at various levels in 2002,  the Nepalese national team (2003), as well as various Nepalese youth teams.
On 21 December 2007, it was announced that Yoo had been hired as the Cambodia national team coach. This appointment was reported to be part of a sponsorship deal with a Korean technology company worth $205 thousand a year, half of which will be Yoo's salary.

Honours

Managerial
South Korean national B team
 Merlion Cup: 1992

References

External links

1947 births
Living people
South Korean footballers
South Korea international footballers
South Korean football managers
South Korean expatriate football managers
Expatriate football managers in Cambodia
Cambodia national football team managers
Expatriate football managers in Bhutan
Bhutan national football team managers
Expatriate football managers in Nepal
Nepal national football team managers
Yonsei University alumni
Association football defenders
South Korean expatriate sportspeople in Bhutan
South Korean expatriate sportspeople in Cambodia
South Korean expatriate sportspeople in Nepal